I Stand may refer to:
 I Stand (album), an album by Idina Menzel
 "I Stand" (Idina Menzel song), a song from the album
 I Stand tour, the tour by Idina Menzel for the album
 "I Stand" (song), a song by Gabriela Gunčíková

See also
 I Stand Alone (disambiguation)